The 2021 Currie Cup Premier Division was the 83rd edition of the top tier of the Currie Cup, the premier domestic rugby union competition in South Africa. It was sponsored by beer brand Carling Black Label and organised by the South African Rugby Union.

The tournament returned to its usual dates, following being played from November to January in 2020/21 due to the COVID-19 pandemic. The tournament also returned to its usual length of 14 rounds followed by finals, following a shortened 7 round competition in 2020/21.

The First Division of the Currie Cup also returned in 2021, having been postponed due to the COVID-19 pandemic in 2020.

Teams

The seven competing teams were:

Regular season

Standings

Tournament points in the standings were awarded to teams as follows:
 4 points for a win.
 2 points for a draw. 
 1 bonus point for a loss in a match by seven points or under. 
 1 bonus point for scoring four tries or more.

Teams were ranked in the standings firstly by tournament points then by: (a) points difference from all matches (points scored less points conceded); (b) tries difference from all matches (tries scored less tries conceded); (c) points difference from the matches between the tied teams; (d) points scored in all matches; (e) tries scored in all matches; and, if needed, (f) a coin toss.

Round-by-round
The table below shows the progression of all teams throughout the Currie Cup season. Each team's tournament points on the standings log is shown for each round, with the overall log position in brackets.

Matches

Listed below are all matches for the double round-robin, played for the 2021 Currie Cup Premier Division.

Round 1

Round 2

Round 3

Round 4

Round 5

Round 6

Round 7

Round 8

Round 9

Round 10

Round 11

Round 12

Round 13

Round 14

Play-offs

Semifinals

Final

The Blue Bulls became the first team in the 130-year history of the Currie Cup competition to lift the trophy twice in the same year having beaten the Sharks in the final of last season’s competition that was delayed by the COVID-19 pandemic to January 2021.

Players

Player Statistics

Team rosters

The respective team squads for the 2021 Currie Cup Premier Division are:

Referees
The following referees officiated matches in the competition:

Champions Match
On 6 October, the South African Rugby Union announced that fans would get a chance to vote and select their own Currie Cup Select XV. The invitational side played Kenya who used the match a preparation ahead of their international matches in November 2021. The selected Currie Cup XV side was announced on 4 November.

See also
 2021 Currie Cup First Division

Notes

References

External links
 SARU website

2021 Currie Cup
2021
Currie Cup 2021
Currie Cup 2021